Alexander Y. "Al" Roelofs (27 October 1906 – 2 July 1990) was a Dutch-born American art director. He was nominated for an Academy Award in the category Best Art Direction for the film The Island at the Top of the World.

Roelofs was born "Alexander IJsbrand Roelofs" in Rotterdam to Paul Roelofs and Catharina de Breij.

Selected filmography
 The Island at the Top of the World (1974)
 Escape to Witch Mountain (1975)

References

External links

1906 births
1990 deaths
American art directors
Dutch emigrants to the United States
Artists from Rotterdam